Keener or Keeners may refer to:

People
An English or Irish surname or an anglicized version of the German surname Kühner, which is derived from Kühn and the Old German kühn (keen). Alternate spellings include Khner, Kienar, Kinar, Kiener, Keene, Kunner, Kenner, Koener, Crossman and other variants.

 Brandon Keener (born 1974), American actor
 Catherine Keener (born 1959), American actress
 Craig S. Keener (born 1960), American professor at Asbury Theological Seminary
 Dean Keener (born 1965), men's basketball coach for the James Madison University Dukes
 Elmore Keener (1935–1973),  co-owner of the Pittsburgh Penguins National Hockey League team
 Emily Keener (born 1998), American singer-songwriter
 Harry Keener (1871–1912), American baseball pitcher
 Hazel Keener (1904–1979), American film actress
 James Keener, American mathematician 
 Jason LaRay Keener (born 1985), American filmmaker
 Jeff Keener (born 1959), American baseball relief pitcher
 Joe Keener (born 1953), American baseball pitcher
 John Christian Keener (1819–1906), American Methodist bishop 
 Stephen Keener (born 1940), voice actor on Transformers

Places
 Keener, Alabama
 Keeners, Missouri
 Keener Cave, Missouri
 Keener, North Carolina
 Keener-Johnson Farm, historic house in Seymour, Tennessee
 Keener Township, Jasper County, Indiana

Other uses
 Keener, professional mourner in Gaelic Irish tradition

See also
 Keening, lamenting as by a keener
 Keen (disambiguation)
 Kenner (disambiguation)